Murat Erkan is a Turkish businessman who on 15 March 2019 became Turkcell's fifth CEO.

Education
Erkan did his undergraduate degree at Yıldız Technical University between 1986 and 1992, with the Department of Electronics and Telecommunication Engineering.  In 2010, he attended the Strategic Marketing Management program at the Harvard Business School.

Career
Murat Erkan, born in 1969, joined Turkcell Group in June 2008 as the General Manager of Turkcell
Superonline and in December 2015 he was appointed as the Executive Vice President of Sales. Mr. Erkan is the
acting Chief Executive Officer effective March 15, 2019. Mr. Erkan, who started his professional life at Toshiba,
worked as an Application Engineer at Biltam Muhendislik and then served as the first “System Engineer” of
Turkey at Cisco Turkey. He served as Chief Officer at Cisco Systems in charge of Technology, Sales, Business
Development and Channel Management. As from 2006, Mr. Erkan served as the Business Unit Manager at
Aneltech responsible for solutions related to telecommunications, mobile, ICT, defense industry and industrial
products sectors. Murat Erkan graduated from the Yildiz Technical University Electronics and
Telecommunication Engineering Department. He completed the Strategic Marketing Program at Harvard
Business School in 2010.

External links

References

Erkan, Murat